The following is a list of known abandoned communities in Quebec, Canada.

 Boscobel
 Crystal Falls
 Gagnon
 Goose Village, Montreal
 Joutel
 Nitchequon
 Rivière-La Guerre
 Saint-Jean-Vianney
 Shrewsbury
 Saint-Nil
 Saint-Thomas-de-Cherbourg
 Saint-Paulin-Dalibaire
 Saint-Octave-de-l'Avenir
 Val-Jalbert (now a tourist attraction)

See also

List of communities in Quebec
List of ghost towns in Canada
List of Indian reserves in Quebec
Census divisions of Quebec

Quebec